The Federal Law Review is a quarterly peer-reviewed law review established in 1964. It is published by the ANU College of Law. It is an A* ranked law review according to the Australian Business Deans Council and Excellence in Research for Australia (ERA) 2010 law journal rankings. It is one of Australia's leading law journals. The Federal Law Review's General Editor is Dr Stephen Thomson.

References

External links

Australian law journals
Quarterly journals
English-language journals
Publications established in 1964